Jean Akono may refer to

 Jean René Akono (born 1976), Cameroonian volleyball player
 Jean-Paul Akono (born 1952), Cameroonian football player